Foreign relations between the Romanian People's Republic and the Syrian Republic were established on 9 August 1955.  Romania has an embassy in Damascus and 2 honorary consulates (in Aleppo and Latakia).  Syria has an embassy in Bucharest and an honorary consulate in Constanţa.

Before Syria suspended itself, both countries were full members of the Union for the Mediterranean.

See also 
 Foreign relations of Romania
 Foreign relations of Syria

External links 
  Romanian Ministry of Foreign Affairs: direction of the Romanian embassy in Damascus
  Romanian Ministry of Foreign Affairs: direction of the Syrian embassy in Bucharest